The Abashevo culture is an early Bronze Age, ca. 2300–1850 BC, archaeological culture found in the valleys of the Volga and Kama River north of the Samara bend and into the southern Ural Mountains. It receives its name from the village of Abashevo in Chuvashia. 

Tracing its origins in the Fatyanovo–Balanovo culture, an eastern offshoot of the Corded Ware culture of Central Europe, the Abashevo culture is notable for its metallurgical activity and use of the chariot in its end phase. It eventually came to absorb the Volosovo culture. The Abashevo culture is often viewed as pre-Indo-Iranian-speaking or Proto-Indo-Iranian-speaking. It played a major role in the development of the Sintashta culture and the Srubnaya culture.

Origins
The Abashevo culture is believed to have formed on the northern Don in the early 3rd millennium BC. It occupied part of the area of the earlier Fatyanovo–Balanovo culture, the eastern variant of the earlier Corded Ware culture.

Influences from further west played a decisive role in the formation of the Abashevo culture. It belongs to a circle of Central European cultures deriving from the Corded Ware culture. The peoples of this environment would eventually develop into Balts, Celts, Italic peoples, Germanic peoples and Slavs. It is from Central Europe that the Abashevo peoples ultimately originated. 

Influences from the Yamnaya culture and Catacomb culture on the Abashevo culture are detected. The pre-eminent expert on the Abashevo culture, Anatoly Pryakhin, concluded that it originated from contacts between Fatyanovo–Balanovo, Catacomb and Poltavka peoples in the southern forest-steppe. The influence of the Yamnaya culture persisted until approximately 1700 BC with the emergence of new technologies, traditions, and customs. 

The Abashevo culture represents an extension of steppe culture into the forest zone.

Distribution
The Abashevo culture flourished in the forest steppe areas of the middle Volga and upper Don. The sites were represented largely by kurgan cemeteries and some areas with evidence of copper smelting. A few settlements extended in the northern steppes of the middle Volga.

The Abashevo culture appears to have absorbed parts of the Volosovo culture. Contacts with the Volosovo culture appears to have facilitated the spread pastoralism and metallurgy into northern forest cultures. 

The easternmost sites of the Abashevo culture are located along the southern Urals. Those sites are associated with the origins of the Sintashta culture. The Abashevo culture is divided into a Don-Volga variant, a middle Volga variant and a southern Ural variant. On the northern Don, the Abashevo culture replaced the Catacomb culture. Along the middle Volga, it co-existed with the Poltavka culture.

Elena E. Kuzmina suggests that the Seima-Turbino phenomenon emerged as a result of interaction between the Abashevo culture, the Catacomb culture and the early Andronovo culture.

Characteristics

Settlements
The type site of the Abashevo culture is at Abashevo, Chuvash Republic. More than two hundred settlements have been found. Some of them appear to have been occupied only briefly, and just two of them appear to have been fortified.

Burials
The Abashevo culture is primarily represented by various kurgan cemeteries. Kurgans were surrounded by a circular ditch, and the grave pit had ledges at its edges. The body was either contracted on the side, or supine with raised knees, with legs flexed. Its funerary customs appear to have been derived from the Poltavka culture. Its inhumation practices in tumuli are similar to the Yamnaya culture and Fatyanovo–Balanovo culture.

Flat graves are a component of the Abashevo culture burial rite, as in the earlier Fatyanovo culture. The kurgans of the Abashevo culture are to be distinguished from the flat graves of the Fatyanovo–Balanovo culture. A well-known Abashevo kurgan in Pepkino contained the remains of twenty-eight males who appear to have died violent deaths. 

Grave offerings are scant, little more than a pot or two usually a made with crushed-shell temper. Some graves show evidence of a birch bark floor and a timber construction forming walls and roof. High-status Abashevo graves contain silver and copper ornaments, and weapons. Crucibles for smelting copper and moulds for casting were found in some graves, most likely funerals reserved to bronzesmiths.

Clothing
High-status Abashevo women are notable for wearing a distinctive type of headband with pendants made of copper and silver. These headbands are unique to the Abashevo culture, and are probably an ethnic marker and symbol of political status.

The diadems of the Abashevo women are very similar to those of elite women in Mycenaean Greece. Elena Efimovna Kuzmina cites this as evidence of cultural synchronization between these ancient cultures.

Ceramics
Abashevo ceramics display influences from the Catacomb culture, which was located further south. Its ceramics in turn influence those of the Sintashta culture.

Metal
The Abashevo culture was an important center of metallurgy, as the southern Urals provided a major source of local copper.  There is evidence of copper smelting, and the culture engaged in copper mining activities, which stimulated the formation of Sintashta metallurgy. 

About half of Abashevo metal objects are of copper, while the other half is of bronze. Silver-bearing ores were also extracted, from which silver ornaments were made. Abashevo metal types, such as knives were very similar to those of the Catacomb culture and the Poltavka culture.

Economy
The economy of the Abashevo culture was mixed agriculture. Cattle, sheep, pig and goats, as well as other domestic animals were kept. Horses were evidently used, inferred by cheek pieces typical of neighboring steppe cultures and Mycenaean Greece. Stone grinders and metal sickles are evidences of agriculture 

The population of Sintashta derived their stock-breeding from Abashevo. Abashevo cattle was of the Ukrainian Grey type, and this cattle had previously been raised among earlier Neolithic cultures of the Pontic steppe and along the Danube. This type of cattle was later adopted by the Sintashta culture and the Srubnaya culture.

Warfare
Archaeological evidence suggests that Abashevo society was intensely warlike. Mass graves reveal that inter-tribal battles involved hundreds of warriors of both sides, which indicates a significant degree of inter-regional political integration. Warfare appears to have been more frequent in the late Abashevo period, and it was in this turbulent environment in which the Sintashta culture emerged.

Linguistics
David Anthony assumes that the Abashevo people spoke Pre-Indo-Iranian or Proto-Indo-Iranian, since it is a possible source of Indo-Iranian loanwords in Uralic. The Aryan characteristic of the Abashevo language is also evidenced in its loanwords in Finnic and Saami.

It probably witnessed a bilingual population undergo a process of assimilation.

Physical type
Physical remains of the Abashevo people has revealed that they were Caucasoids/Europoids with dolichocephalic skulls. Abashevo skulls are very similar to those of the preceding Fatyanovo–Balanovo culture, and the succeeding Sintashta culture, Andronovo culture and Srubnaya culture, while differing from those of the Yamnaya culture, Poltavka culture, Catacomb culture and Potapovka culture, which although being of a similar robust Europoid type, are less dolichocephalic. The physical type of Abashevo, Sintashta, Andronovo and Srubnaya is later observed among the Scythians.

Genetics

Successors
The Abashevo culture is closely associated with the Sintashta culture, and must have played a role in its origin. The Sintashta culture however differs from the Abashevo culture through having fortified settlements, conducting large-scale animal sacrifices, and in its metal types and ornaments. 

Continuity between the Abashevo culture and the later Srubnaya culture have been pointed out. Along with the Potapovka culture, the Abashevo culture is considered an ancestor of the Srubnaya culture. The Potapovka culture itself emerged from the Poltavka culture with influences from the Abashevo culture.

See also

 Bronze Age Europe

Notes

References

Sources

Further reading
 

Indo-Iranian archaeological cultures
Archaeological cultures of Eastern Europe
Bronze Age cultures of Europe
Archaeological cultures in Russia
History of Ural
History of Chuvashia
History of Mari El
History of Tatarstan
History of Bashkortostan
History of Perm Krai
History of Kirov Oblast
History of Ulyanovsk Oblast
History of Samara Oblast
History of Lipetsk Oblast
History of Voronezh Oblast
Corded Ware culture